Pedinoida is an order of sea urchins, containing the single living genus  Caenopedina. The group was much more diverse during the Mesozoic, and represents the oldest surviving order of euechinoid sea urchins.

They are distinguished from other sea urchins by the presence of a rigid test with tessellated plates. While their primary spines are solid, the smaller ones may be hollow, further distinguishing them from the closely related orders Diadematoida and Echinothurioida, which possess only hollow spines.

References
 
 

 
Extant Early Triassic first appearances